"Coffee (Give Me Something)" is a song by Dutch disc jockey and producer Tiësto and Brazilian disc jockey and producer Vintage Culture. It was released on 14 August 2020 in the Netherlands.

Background and release 
Tiësto declared about the song : "When we heard the vocal for 'Coffee', we immediately had a ton of inspiration to work on this. And quarantine gave us a lot of time to try different versions and perfect the record. [...] It’s something for home playlists but also for the club." Vintage Culture described then : "The challenge was finding the right song. With ‘Coffee (Give Me Something)’, we’ve created a track that will make the fans dance, combined with a melody they will remember long after the song is over."

Track listing 
Digital Download
 "Coffee (Give Me Something)" - 3:09

 Digital Download - Quintino Remix
 "Coffee (Give Me Something)" (Quintino Remix) - 2:31

 Digital Download - Ferreck Dawn Remix
 "Coffee (Give Me Something)" (Ferreck Dawn Femix) - 2:52

 Digital Download - Jose Amnesia Remix
 "Coffee (Give Me Something)" (Jose Amnesia Remix) - 5:17

 Digital Download - IFK Remix
 "Coffee (Give Me Something)" (IFK Remix) - 3:38

Charts

References 

2020 songs
2020 singles
Tiësto songs
Songs written by Tiësto
Songs written by Jon Maguire
Songs written by Andrew Bullimore